Athens International Airport Eleftherios Venizelos (Diethnís Aeroliménas Athinón "Elefthérios Venizélos"), commonly initialised as AIA , is the largest international airport in Greece, serving the city of Athens and region of Attica. It began operation on 28 March 2001 (in time for the 2004 Summer Olympics) and is the main base of Aegean Airlines, as well as other smaller Greek airlines. It replaced the old Ellinikon International Airport.  Athens International is currently a member of Group 1 of Airports Council International (over 25 million passengers) as of 2022, it is the 19th-busiest airport in Europe and the busiest and largest in the Balkans.

History

Development and ownership 

The airport is named after Elefthérios Venizélos, the prominent Cretan political figure and Prime Minister of Greece, who made a significant contribution to the development of Greek aviation and the Hellenic Air Force in the 1930s. As to-date, the airport is operated by AIA S.A. and ownership is divided between the Hellenic Republic (Greek State) and Private Sector in a 55%-45% stake following a PPP scheme for the airport company. Currently, private investors include the Copelouzos Group (5%) and PSP Investments of Canada (40%), following purchase of Hochtief's shares.

The airport was constructed to replace the now-closed Athens (Ellinikon) International Airport, as the latter had reached its saturation point with no physical space for further growth. Studies for a new airport had been carried out from as early as the 1970s, with as many as 19 different locations being looked at before an area close to the town of Spata was chosen as suitable. Athens Airport SA, a state-owned company, was established in 1978 to proceed with the plans. However, after delays and slow development, the project was revived in 1991, approximately 1 year after the city lost the right to host the 1996 Summer Olympics to Atlanta, USA and the possibility of submitting a bid for the 2000 Game was discussed. However, the city presented the project that was eventually the winner for the 2004 Summer Olympic Games. with the then government launching an international tender for the selection of a build-own-operate-transfer partner for the airport project, with Hochtief of Germany being selected.

In 1996, Athens International Airport S.A. (AIA) was established as a Public–private partnership with a 30-year concession agreement. That same year, the €2.1 billion development finally began with an estimated completion date of February 2001. The airport construction was completed five months before schedule, but was delayed opening a month due to surface connections to Attiki Odos not being completed. The airport officially opened on 28 March 2001
The airport has received approval from the European Aviation Safety Agency and the Federal Aviation Administration for take-offs and landings of the biggest passenger jet worldwide, the A380. The first ever A380 to visit 'Eleftherios Venizelos' Athens International Airport made an emergency landing on 13 April 2011 for emergency medical reasons. The first scheduled A380 flight took place on 26 October 2012 by Emirates.

Greek government debt-crisis impact (2009–2013) 
The Greek government-debt crisis reduced the overall passenger traffic of the airport for six consecutive years. Many long-haul airlines outright terminated service to the airport, while others chose to operate on a seasonal basis only, opting to terminate service during the winter months. Moreover, these problems were further exacerbated by the closure of Olympic Airlines, which operated many long-haul flights to and from the airport. In 2013, the airport handled just above 12.5 million passengers, 3.2% fewer than in 2012 and lower by approximately 25% when compared to 2007's traffic, which was the all-time-high at that time.

Recovery and new levels of passenger traffic (2014–2015) 
2014 signaled a strong recovery for the airport's passenger traffic and all statistical figures. More than ten new airlines started new flights to and from Athens. Aegean Airlines strengthened its network by 30% (with many more destinations scheduled for 2015) while Ryanair established a new base in the Athens Airport and added eight destinations. The airport company recorded an increase in passenger traffic in excess of 21% during 2014, reaching 15.1 million passengers, resulted both by new destinations but also by increased capacity offered on established ones. Characteristically, Singapore and Gulf Air resumed flights while Emirates, Etihad Airways and Qatar Airways fly more frequently to/from Athens. Delta Air Line resumed their weekly flights and American Airlines retained their seasonal schedules to/from USA with even more frequent connectivity. From 2017 onwards, year-round services to Singapore are going to resume after more than five years. Flights are going to be operated by Scoot.

According to AIA published statistics, total traffic for 2015 achieved an impressive performance reaching almost 18.1 million passengers, an all-time-record for the airport at that time, increased by 19% on year-over-year basis and by 1.55 million (+9.4%) the previous best, which was the pre-crisis year 2007. In addition, over the same period, aircraft traffic exhibited a solid growth of 14% year-over-year. Moreover, in 2015 a significant rise (+38%) was recorded by transfer passengers, with the international to international transfer traffic marking an impressive increase (+60%) demonstrating the significant enhancement of the Athens airport connectivity.

Exceeding twenty million passengers (2016–2018) and beyond 
2016 was a landmark year for the Athens International Airport, both for domestic and international destinations. Annual results reflected a solid performance for a third year in a row fueled by double-digit growth, this time passing the twenty million mark, increased by 10.7% on year-over-year basis. Healthy growth continued in 2017 with the airport showing traffic increase of 8.6% to a total of 21.7 million passengers, yet another all-time record for the Athens airport. During 2018, the airport achieved yet another record high, reporting increased passenger traffic by 11% to more than 24.1 million passengers. Equally, aircraft traffic achieved a new record with a reported annual growth of 10.8% to 217,094 movements.

For the first three quarters of 2019, the airport traffic shows signs of further increase with passenger numbers up by 6.5% to 19.97 million passengers and aircraft movements up by 3.2%.

Terminals

Overview 
The airport currently has two terminals, the main terminal and the satellite terminal accessible by an underground link from the main terminal.
It is designed to be extended in a modular approach over the ensuing years in order to accommodate increases in air travel. These extensions are planned in a six-phase framework. The first (and current) phase allowed the airport to accommodate 26 million passengers per year. When the airport originally opened, the current phase called for a capacity of only 16 million passengers per year; however, the capacity was able to increase without progressing to the next phase thanks to advanced IT logistics. The sixth and final expansion phase will allow the airport to accommodate an annual traffic of 50 million passengers, with the current layout leaving enough space for five more terminals to be added. As such, the parallel runway system currently in place has been designed to accommodate flight traffic with this high equivalent annual passenger load upon completion of the final expansion phase.

Main Terminal 
The main terminal building handles all intra-Schengen flights, as well as several non-Schengen flights. All of the airport's 144 check-in desks are located in the Main Terminal and it has three separate levels, one for arrivals, one for departures and a food court level complete with a view of the eastern runway. Finally, the terminal is equipped with fourteen jet bridges and eleven belt conveyors for luggage.

 Hall A is used for flights to Non-schengen countries and Non-European countries.
 Hall B handles flights to Intra-schengen countries as well as domestic services.

In March 2018, the Athens International Airport issued a tender for its first physical expansion, concerning the south wings of the main terminal. The tender called for a building expansion with a total area of approximately 14,950 square meters over five levels (levels 0 to 4). The construction company to build the expansion has been awarded in summer 2018 and the project is scheduled to be completed by mid-2019. It will add 18 more counter check-in decks as well as additional space for arrivals, departures, security and automated control gates, it will also add expanded shopping area and new lounges by mid-2020.

Satellite Terminal 
The satellite terminal has two levels, one for arrivals and the other for departures. It is easily accessible through an underground link complete with moving walkways. The terminal is equipped with ten jet bridges and is capable of handling annual traffic of six million passengers.

In recent years its parking stands were utilized for long-term storage of airliners, specifically two ex-Olympic Airways Airbus A340-300s (both aircraft were transferred to its new owner in February 2017) and a Boeing 767-300ER of defunct Greek start-up carrier SkyGreece Airlines. However, as of June 2017, the parking space of the satellite terminal is in full use for both Schengen and non-Schengen area flights and to accommodate increased traffic. From June 2017 some low-cost carriers were using it. On 24 May 2018, the Satellite Terminal officially restarted full operations. The airlines using it are Ryanair, Easyjet, Vueling, Eurowings, Norwegian, Transavia and Transavia France, TUIfly Belgium, Brussels Airlines, Aer Lingus, Air Transat and Scoot.

Airlines and destinations 
The following airlines operate regular scheduled and charter flights at Athens Airport:

Statistics 
Athens International Airport is the largest and busiest airport in Greece. By the end of 2021, it was the 15th busiest airport in Europe.

Annual statistics

Busiest passenger routes by country 
The table below shows passenger totals at Athens International Airport by country destination during 2021, and changes compared to 2020.

Airline market share 2021

Airline alliance market share 2021

Passengers 2021

Ground transport

Railway and Metro 

A railway station is immediately adjacent to the airport terminal, accessible by an elevated walkway. Athens Metro line 3 and the suburban railway service Proastiakos run trains to and from this station.

Road 
The airport is accessible by the Attiki Odos toll highway from the centre and northern Athens, Varis-Koropiou Avenue from the western part, Laurio Ave. from the South, and Spata-Loutsa Avenue from the East. A variety of parking options are available on site at the airport in three different parking lots. Located at the arrivals level, opposite the airport terminal, the airport offers short-term parking for up to five hours with 1,357 parking spaces available in lots P1 and P2. Long-term parking is located across the airport's main access road (Attiki Odos) with 5,802 parking spaces in lot P3. A free shuttle bus is available to transport passengers, while the lots are also accessible by foot to the terminal. Premium valet service is also offered at the Departures level by Entrance 3.

Taxi 
Taxis are available at the designated Taxi waiting area located by exit 3 of the arrivals level. Limousine service is also available upon request by the inner curbside of the arrivals level between exits 3 and 4.
</ref>

Bus 
Four bus lines (X93, X95, X96, X97) connect directly to the Athens greater area, X95 starts from Syntagma square, X93 connects the airport to intercity bus stations (KTEL Kifissos Bus Terminal and Liosion bus terminal), X96 to Athens main port Piraeus and X97 to Elliniko metro station the Southern terminal of Line 2. Buses disembark passengers at the departures level and depart from the arrivals level between exits 4 and 5. Regional bus services by KTEL Express operate to the airport, currently connecting the airport to Rafina, Markopoulo, Lavrio, Kalyvia and Keratea.

Other facilities 

 Aegean Airlines and Olympic Air have their head office in Building 57 on the airport property. Olympic Air also has offices in Building 53A.
 The Air Accident Investigation and Aviation Safety Board has an office in Office 1311 in Building 11.

 The Greek fast food company Goody's S.A. has its head office in Building 14B.
 Sofitel Hotel
 Retail Park
 Two robotic systems, named Hercules and Ulysses, are used by the airport for the handling of potentially dangerous materials.  They were donated by the Stavros Niarchos Foundation.

See also 
List of the busiest airports in Greece
Transport in Greece

References

External links 
 
 
 
 Athens International Airport "Eleftherios Venizelos"

Airports in Greece
Transport in East Attica
Public–private partnership projects in Greece
Transport infrastructure in Attica
Buildings and structures in East Attica
Spata-Artemida
Airports established in 2001
2001 establishments in Greece
Transport in Athens